5'nizza (slang spelling of  , meaning "Friday") is an acoustic group formed in 2000 in Kharkiv, Ukraine that disbanded in 2007 and reunited in 2015. It is made up of friends Serhii Babkin (guitar), and Andrii "Sun" Zaporozhets (vocals).

The band's music has a combination of influences: reggae, Latin, rock and hip hop, which is performed in a minimalistic folk style limited to vocals, beatboxing, and acoustic guitar. Despite lack of support from large labels, the group attracted cult following in much of Central and Eastern Europe, notably Ukraine, Russia, Belarus, Poland and Germany.

5'nizza's song "" ("Natyany") was featured on American Idol, Season 16 Episode 2, on March 12, 2018 in the USA on ABC Television, when sung by Idol contestant Misha Gontar. Although the judges were intrigued by his Ukrainian rap, he was not invited to continue in the competition.

Background 

The duo started working together as early as in 1998. 5'nizza's demo album, Unplugged, was bootlegged and spread all over the C.I.S. countries in 2002. The demo was well received by fans as well as online critics. Some even say that, in 2002, Unplugged was the top seller in Russia.

Their official debut album, Pyatnitsa, was produced in 2003 and consisted mostly of songs from Unplugged.

The second album O'5 (read as "Опять"/"Opyat'", meaning Again in Russian. ) was released in 2005.

Both Babkin and Zaporozhets have released other musical projects in addition to their work together. Babkin (a solo artist since 2004) has recorded three solo albums: Ura, SN. G, Bis! and Motor; and Zaporozhets appeared as a backing vocalist in Lюk (Luk), a lounge group. Babkin is also an actor in the Kharkiv theater group Theater 19. Andrii Zaporozhets is currently completing his university degree in pediatrics.

Tour and disbanding 
5'nizza toured Russia and visited Minsk, Belarus, as well. 5'nizza also visited Lithuania, the band was one of the main guests at the open-air festival Cote of Culture (Kultūros Tvartas) in 2004. . The band recorded its third album in 2007, with guest appearances from Lюk and Маркшайдер Кунст (Markscheider Kunst), among others. In September 2007, Babkin and Zaporozhets decided to disband. Their last two concerts took place on June 15 and 16, 2007 in Warsaw and Kraków, respectively.

The third album was instead released as Zaporozhets' new project SunSay. Following the group's disbandment, artists that originally were meant to be guests now became the core of a new group. This added to the overwhelming change in sound direction, with new ideas and instruments coming from, what seemed to be, everywhere. The few tracks with Babkin's presence (guitar and backing vocals) that reached final production also made the final cut.

Reunion

In March 2015 Serhii Babkin and Andrii Zaporozhets announced their reunion and in April the song "I Believe In You" was released, followed by "Vperyod" and "Ale". The band played the A2 Club in St Petersburg in 2017 reuniting as a trio with "Dizzy" Daniel Moorehead while he was at PGUPS.

Notes and references 

Musical groups from Kharkiv
Ukrainian musical groups
English-language singers from Ukraine
Ukrainian reggae musical groups